Banu Hammed بنو حامد or also known as Al-Hammedi الحامدي, plural Al-Hawamed الحوامد was one of the tribes that had migrated from the Arab states of the Persian Gulf to Iran and had settled there during the Islamic conquest of Persia and later on due to trade. Many of the members of the tribes have left and have come back to these Arab states. Banu Hammed members are now in the UAE, Qatar and Bahrain. The Banu Hammed tribe are not nomads, most of them being traders with a minority of the tribe being goat and camel herders.

Population
The tribe has along the lines of 20,000 members subdivided into different clans also known as (عشائر). The tribe has settled in the Bar Fars region of coastal Iran. Having a large percentage of them living in Lar, Bastak, Bandar Lengeh and Bandar Abbas.

Tribes of Arabia

References